Prema Zindabad is a 1990 Telugu-language comedy film, produced by B. A. V. Sandilya and V. Bhoopal Reddy under the Sangeetha Art Films banner and directed by Jandhyala. It stars Rajendra Prasad and Aiswarya, with music composed by Madhavapeddi Suresh.

Plot
The film begins on Gopalam (Rajendra Prasad) a simpleton, aims to marry the girl one that discernible in his dream. Meanwhile, he acquires a job in a company, thereupon, he meets his childhood friend Anjaneyulu (Subhalekha Sudhakar). Afterward, he perceives his dream girl as Anjaneyulu's sister Bharati (Aishwarya) and they fall in love. Here, Gopalam learns there is a hindrance to their espousal. Bharati has an unmarried sister Swarajyam (Vijaya Lakshmi) who is in love with a guy Kalyan (Sasi Kumar) in their village. Just now, Kalyan's avaricious father Prakasam (Raja Rao) is craving dowry. But Bose Babu (Subbaraya Sarma) father of Anjineeyulu, as a patriot, deplores dowry. During that dilemma, Gopalam provides a guarantee to secretly allot the dowry amount and asks Anjaneyulu hands over to Prakasam. Trusting it, Anjaneyulu gives the affirmation. But unfortunately, Gopalam fails to raise the amount and alliance breaks off. Soon, as a flabbergast, Swarajyam gets murdered and Gopalam is indicted in the crime. The rest of the story is a comic tale, that how Gopalam proves his innocence, finds out that the real culprits as Prakasam & Kalyan and make them sentenced. Finally, the movie ends on a happy note with the marriage of Gopalam & Bharati.

Cast
Rajendra Prasad as Gopalam
Aiswarya as Bharati 
Subhalekha Sudhakar as Anjaneyulu
Kota Srinivasa Rao as S.I. Ahobilam 
Brahmanandam as Charplin Nataraju
Suthi Velu as Muddu Krishna 
Dharmavarapu Subramanyam as Head Constable 
Subbaraya Sharma as Bose Babu 
Ashok Kumar as S.P.
Nittela as Denthal Murthy 
Kadambari Kiran
Jenny as  Neelakantam

Soundtrack

Music composed by Madhapeddi Suresh.

References

External links

Indian comedy films
Films directed by Jandhyala
1990s Telugu-language films
1990 comedy films
1990 films